1-63 Windmill Street, Millers Point is a heritage-listed residence located at 1-63 Windmill Street, in the inner city Sydney suburb of Millers Point in the City of Sydney local government area of New South Wales, Australia. The property is privately owned. It was added to the New South Wales State Heritage Register on 2 April 1999.

History 
Millers Point is one of the earliest areas of European settlement in Australia, and a focus for maritime activities.

This terrace was built  as part of the post-plague redevelopment. An 1880 plan shows a two-storey hotel on this site.

In 1958 architect John Fisher (member of the Institute of Architects, the Cumberland County Council Historic Buildings Committee and on the first Council of the National Trust of Australia (NSW) after its reformation in 1960), with the help of artist Cedric Flower, convinced Taubmans to paint the central bungalow at 50 Argyle Place. This drew attention to the importance of The Rocks for the first time. As a result, Fisher was able to negotiate leases for Bligh House (later ClydeBank) and houses in Windmill Street for various medical societies.

First tenanted by the NSW Department of Housing in 1982.

Description 

Two storey, three bedroom, Federation terrace with gable to street. Decorative pressed metal gable detailing. Storeys: Two; Construction: Face brick, painted reinforced concrete, pressed metal, corrugated galvanised iron, painted joinery. Cast iron railings. Style: Federation.

The external condition of the building is good.

Modifications and dates 
External: Surface mounted services.

Heritage listing 
As at 23 November 2000, 1-63 Windmill Street is an extensive group of Federation style terraces in very good condition, having high streetscape value.

It is part of the Millers Point Conservation Area, an intact residential and maritime precinct. It contains residential buildings and civic spaces dating from the 1830s and is an important example of 19th century adaptation of the landscape.

1-63 Windmill Street, Millers Point was listed on the New South Wales State Heritage Register on 2 April 1999.

See also 

Australian residential architectural styles
65 Windmill Street

References

Bibliography

Attribution

External links

 

New South Wales State Heritage Register sites located in Millers Point
Terraced houses in Sydney
Articles incorporating text from the New South Wales State Heritage Register
1910 establishments in Australia
Houses completed in 1910
Millers Point Conservation Area